Jonathan Cole may refer to:
Jonathan Cole (composer) (born 1970), British composer and professor of composition
Jonathan R. Cole (born 1942), American sociologist
Jonathan Cole (psychiatrist) (died 2009), American psychiatrist
Jonathan Cole (NCIS), a character in the television series NCIS
Jonathan Cole (British Army officer) (born 1967), British general

See also
Jon Cole (disambiguation)